Lake Annis  is a lake of Yarmouth District, in Nova Scotia, Canada. It is at an elevation of about 40m above sea level and is on the Annis River. The small community of Lake Annis adjacent to the lake.

See also
List of lakes in Nova Scotia

References

Annis